Pip, Squeak and Wilfred was a British strip cartoon published in the Daily Mirror from 1919 to 1956 (with a break c. 1940–1950), as well as the Sunday Pictorial in the early years. It was conceived by Bertram Lamb, who took the role of Uncle Dick, signing himself (B.J.L.) in an early book, and was drawn until c. 1939 by Austin Bowen Payne, who always signed as A. B. Payne. It concerned the adventures of an orphaned family of animals. Pip, who assumed the "father" role, was a dog, while the "mother", Squeak, was a penguin. Wilfred was the "young son" and was a rabbit with very long ears.

Character beginnings 
The characters Pip, Squeak and Wilfred were created by Bertram Lamb, a journalist on the Daily Mirror, who was born in Islington, London, on 14 May 1887 and died in Switzerland in 1938. He never drew the cartoons, but thought up the idea of the characters.

The origins of the characters are mentioned in the cartoon strips. Squeak was found in the London Zoological Gardens after hatching on the South African coast years before. Pip was discovered begging by a policeman on the Thames Embankment, and was sent to a dogs' home, where he was bought for half-a-crown. Wilfred was found in a field near his burrow and was adopted by Pip and Squeak, who were in turn looked after by Uncle Dick and Angeline, the housemaid of their family house on the edge of London.

The WLOG fanclub 
In 1927 the Pip, Squeak and Wilfred club began. It was named the Wilfredian League of Gugnuncs (WLOG) and organised many competitions and events for thousands of members, especially at the British South Coast Seaside resorts. "Gugnuncs" is a combination of two baby-talk words used by Wilfred, who as a toddler-aged rabbit cannot speak yet, nunc being his version of uncle. There was a WLOG member's badge in blue enamelled metal, featuring the long ears of Wilfred. Among the WLOG rules was one to never eat rabbit.

Cartoon films 
A series of silent animated cartoons were produced in 1921 by Lancelot Speed, titled "The Wonderful Adventures of Pip, Squeak & Wilfred". Twenty–five 5-minute shorts were made (being paired with the Mirror-Pictorial Newsreel), and were first–shown between 17 February 1921 and 11 August 1921. Titles included 'Pip And Wilfred Detectives', 'Over The Edge Of The World', 'The Six-Armed Image', 'The Castaways', 'Ups And Downs', 'Popski's Early Life', 'Wilfred's Nightmare', 'Wilfred's Wonderful Adventures' and 'Trouble In The Nursery'. None appears to be currently available in any format.

Annuals 
An early book was Pip, Squeak & Wilfred, Their "Luvly" Adventures, issued in 1921 by Stanley Paul & Co, London. This book recapped on the earliest Daily Mirror strips, showing how they were introduced. Luvly being one of Squeak's favourite words.

Pip and Squeak Annuals appeared each year from 1922, dated as the 1923 to 1939 annuals. A separate Wilfred's Annual also appeared, dated 1924 to 1938, featuring stories aimed at under-10 year olds.
The 1934 Pip & Squeak Annual featured a 'magic red frame' which allowed the reader to see hidden pictures on several pages. The 1934 Wilfred's Annual similarly featured a Pantomime cut-out insert.
The final Pip & Squeak annual of 1939 incorporated Wilfred's Annual, which had ended the previous year, and is the rarest of the series due to low sales and poor quality paper being used. No annual was issued in 1940.

The annuals continued the 1920s type of fairyland surrealism in their pages until the last annual, by which time other more popular annuals such as Bobby Bear and Teddy Tail were more contemporary, leaving this series appearing rather dated in comparison, meaning later years of Pip and Squeak annual and especially Wilfred's annual sold in smaller quantities.

There were three Uncle Dick's Annuals issued from 1929 to 1931, dated as the 1930 to 1932 annuals, the first one being fully named 'Uncle Dick's Competition Annual'. These annuals were aimed more at boys, with action stories and very little Pip & Squeak content. As their title suggests, the books were in an elaborate competition format where you had to solve quizzes, paint in pictures and similar to win prizes.

A short-lived revived Pip, Squeak & Wilfred annual was issued in the mid-1950s, as the characters had been revived in the Daily Mirror a few years previously. This featured the characters updated and now drawn by a new, uncredited, artist. A newly bow-tied Wilfred and a younger Auntie, both previously only saying the odd nonsensical word, were now made to speak fully, losing the innocence and surreal charm of the pre-war years, to better fit the 1950s. Stanley, a young penguin, became a regular character, having been introduced in the later 1930s annuals. The annual featured stories with the characters as well as cartoon strips and other non-related stories.

A small paperback comic book, Adventures of Pip Squeak & Wilfred was published in the early 1920s in the Merry Miniatures series by Home Publicity of London, and was just  in size.

Newspaper supplements 
The Daily Mirror featured a Saturday 4-page pull-out comic supplement, starting on Saturday, 15 October 1921, titled The Adventures of Pip, Squeak and Wilfred : No 1 - Thrills in the Dog and cat Later editions were reduced to 3 pages on 25 March 1922, then to 2 pages on 8 July 1922 until the supplement ended in 1924.

The popularity of Pip, Squeak & Wilfred was immense. The 16 December 1922 edition of the Daily Mirror reported 100,000 copies of the 1923 Pip and Squeak Annual had been sold.

In military terminology

War medals
After the First World War (1914–18), three medals were awarded to most of the British servicemen who had served from 1914 or 1915. They were either the 1914 Star or the 1914–15 Star, the British War Medal, and the British Victory Medal. They were irreverently referred to as Pip, Squeak and Wilfred respectively.

Royal Air Force
After the First World War, the Royal Air Force named its three Blackburn Kangaroo training aircraft Pip, Squeak, and Wilfred.

During the Second World War, Pip-squeak was the code name of a radio–navigation system fitted to some RAF fighters. This periodically transmitted 15-second tones from the aircraft's radio. These signals were used by ground-based radio direction finder stations to determine the location of the aircraft.

In early 1944 the radio callsign GUGNUNC was used by No. 255 Squadron RAF in southern Italy. The squadron's Operations Record Book makes specific reference to this in the context of a search for a missing Beaufighter.

Palestine, 1936 

During the first stage of the 1936–1939 Arab revolt in Palestine, two anti-aircraft guns and one searchlight were taken, with their crews, from HMS Sussex (96) and mounted on trucks, in order to provide fire support to ground units. These were named "Pip" (a two-pounder QF 2-pounder naval gun), "Squeak" (a QF 3-pounder Vickers gun) and "Wilfred" (the searchlight).

Operation Wilfred
Operation Wilfred was a 1940 operation, during the Phoney War, to mine the waters off the Norwegian coast in an attempt to restrict the supply of iron ore from Sweden to Germany.  The name was coined by Winston Churchill and inspired by the comic series.  In The Gathering Storm, Churchill explains that the operation was called this because it was so small.

Gun sites
Stationed in France to guard the airfields of the RAF's Advanced Air Striking Force during the Phoney War, 53rd (City of London) Heavy Anti-Aircraft Regiment, Royal Artillery code-named its gun-sites PIP I & II, SQUEAK I & II and WILFRED I & II (Regimental HQ was codenamed PIXO).

Wilfred and Trotsky
According to 2007 Nobel Prize in Literature winner Doris Lessing's autobiography, Wilfred, or "Wilfski" as she calls him, was based on Trotsky.

References 
Citations

Bibliography
 Daily Mirror Newspaper Saturday Editions 15 October 1921 - 8 September 1923
 Pip, Squeak & Wilfred, Their "Luvly" Adventures (1921) Stanley Paul & Co, London
 Pip and Squeak Annuals 1923-1939
 Wilfred's Annual 1924-1938
 Uncle Dick's (Competition) Annual 1930-1932
 Cartoons Details
 Under My Skin: Part One of My Autobiography. To 1949.  London: HarperCollins Publishers. (1994.)

British comic strips
1919 comics debuts
1956 comics endings
Humor comics
Text comics
Fantasy comics
Fictional dogs
Anthropomorphic dogs
Fictional rabbits and hares
Fictional penguins
British comics characters
Comics about dogs
Comics about penguins
Comics about rabbits and hares
Comics about animals
Comics adapted into animated series
Male characters in comics
Daily Mirror